Route 9 is a  major east–west state highway in Massachusetts. Along with U.S. Route 20 (US 20), Route 2, and Interstate 90, Route 9 is one of the major east–west routes of Massachusetts. The western terminus is near the center of the city of Pittsfield.  After winding through the small towns along the passes of the Berkshire Mountains, it crosses the college towns of the Pioneer Valley and then south of the Quabbin Reservoir and the rural areas of western Worcester County.  Entering the city of Worcester from the southwest corner of the city, it passes through the center of the city and forms the major commercial thoroughfare through the MetroWest suburbs of Boston, parallel to the Massachusetts Turnpike.   Crossing the Route 128 freeway circling Boston, it passes through the inner suburbs of Newton and Brookline along Boylston Street, and enters Boston on Huntington Avenue, before reaching its eastern terminus at Copley Square.

Route description
Route 9 passes through six counties and twenty-eight cities and towns.  It begins in the western Massachusetts city of Pittsfield, at U.S. Route 20. After separating from US-20, it has a brief .2 mile concurrency with U.S. Route 7 through the center of that city, then continues east, passing through the towns of Dalton and Windsor, wherein the route reaches its highest point at 2033 ft, in Berkshire County.  It continues its winding pass through the small towns of The Berkshires in Berkshire and western Hampshire Counties before passing through the center of Northampton, passing Smith College before its first interstate junction, at Interstate 91.  It then crosses the Connecticut River at the Calvin Coolidge Bridge, just downstream from Elwell Island.  It goes through the retail area of Hadley before passing the University of Massachusetts Amherst and Amherst College.  From Amherst, it winds its way into western Worcester County, south of the Quabbin Reservoir, through small towns until it makes its way into the city of Worcester.

Once in Worcester, Route 9 becomes a major thoroughfare through the city, as Park Avenue, Highland Street (which passes Major Taylor Boulevard), before passing over Interstate 290 and Belmont Street, where University of Massachusetts Medical School and the former Worcester State Hospital are located. At its intersection with McRae Ct., it becomes a divided highway with raised median.  From Worcester, it crosses Lake Quinsigamond into Shrewsbury.  At this point, Route 9 becomes the main retail artery of the MetroWest region.  Several plazas and chain stores are located along the route as it makes its way towards Northborough, where it crosses U.S. Route 20; Westborough, where it crosses Interstate 495; and eventually in the Golden Triangle retail area of Framingham and Natick, after crossing the Massachusetts Turnpike.  It passes Shopper's World and the Natick Mall, New England's largest mall.

Beginning in the Golden Triangle, Route 9 becomes one of the major routes into Boston, serving as a valuable bypass to the Mass Pike and its tolls.  It crosses Interstate 95 (also known as Massachusetts Route 128) in Wellesley before crossing the Charles River into Newton and Brookline as Boylston Street.  It enters the city of Boston by crossing over Brookline's former namesake, the Muddy River, part of the Emerald Necklace.  At this point it becomes Huntington Avenue, also known as "Avenue of the Arts".  It loses its raised median briefly between its intersection with S. Huntington Ave. and Brigham Circle.  It passes the Longwood Medical and Academic Area, which includes Brigham and Women's Hospital, Harvard Medical School and other hospitals; the Museum of Fine Arts; and several colleges and universities, including Northeastern University.  This stretch is also a major site of baseball history; the first game of the 1903 World Series, baseball's first true World Series, was played at the Huntington Avenue Grounds, the original home of the Boston Red Sox.  (The site is now part of Northeastern's campus.)  The E branch of the MBTA Green Line roughly follows Huntington Avenue underground from Copley Square until it rises above ground at the Northeastern portal. It then operates in a dedicated median of Huntington Avenue between Northeastern University and the Brigham Circle stop, where trains begin street running in mixed traffic to a terminus at Heath Street. Route 9 continues past Symphony Hall and The First Church of Christ, Scientist, which is the mother church of Christian Science.  It then passes Copley Place and the Prudential Center complex, before splitting, the eastbound half onto Stuart Street, the westbound onto Saint James Street, past Copley Square; both the eastbound and westbound segments of Route 9 end at Route 28.

History
Route 9 was established in 1933. It took over the alignment of what was Route 115 from Kenmore Square in Boston to Route 22 in North Grafton, part of the original route of US 20 between North Grafton and West Brookfield and the original Route 109 between West Brookfield and US 7 in Pittsfield. Route 9's original route in Boston was along Brookline Avenue from Kenmore Square turning west onto its current path along Boylston Street. Between Worcester and Boston, Route 9 follows the path of the 19th-century Worcester Turnpike, opened in 1810. This route originally included a floating bridge over Lake Quinsigamond in Shrewsbury. From Dalton to Goshen in the Berkshires, the road follows the old Berkshire Trail.  The massive expansion of the University of Massachusetts Amherst transformed that part of Route 9 in the late 20th century; this otherwise rural part of the route now has several shops, restaurants, and the mid-sized Hampshire Mall. In the 20th century, Route 9 became the focus for urban sprawl in towns like Newton and Wellesley. Further west, in Framingham, Route 9 was home to one of the first modern shopping malls, the aptly named Shoppers' World.

In Natick, Route 9 is officially the "Ted Williams Highway", named after the Red Sox sports legend Ted Williams, who sported that number. In Newton, it is officially the "United Spanish War Veterans Highway".

From 1903 to 1932, the Boston and Worcester Street Railway ran mostly via Route 9.  Today the E branch of the MBTA's Green Line follows Route 9 along Huntington Avenue.

Major intersections

Gallery

See also
 19th-century turnpikes in Massachusetts

References

External links 

009
Worcester Turnpike
Transportation in Berkshire County, Massachusetts
Transportation in Hampshire County, Massachusetts
Transportation in Middlesex County, Massachusetts
Transportation in Norfolk County, Massachusetts
Transportation in Suffolk County, Massachusetts
Transportation in Worcester County, Massachusetts
Transportation in Boston